Karniyarik (lit. 'riven belly' in Turkish) is a dish found in Turkish cuisine consisting of eggplant stuffed with a mix of sautéed chopped onions, garlic, black pepper, tomatoes, optional green pepper,  parsley and ground meat.

A similar dish is the İmam bayıldı, which does not include meat and is served at room temperature or warm.

The dish is often served with rice.

See also
 Moussaka
 Papoutsakia
 List of casserole dishes
 List of eggplant dishes

References

Further reading
 
 

Eggplant dishes
Stuffed vegetable dishes
Turkish words and phrases
Casserole dishes
Ground meat
Turkish cuisine